Bitnje may refer to several settlements in Slovenia: 

Bitnje, Bohinj, a settlement in the Municipality of Bohinj
Spodnje Bitnje, a settlement in the Municipality of Kranj
Srednje Bitnje, a settlement in the Municipality of Kranj
Zgornje Bitnje, a settlement in the Municipality of Kranj